Rouillac is the name of the following communes in France:

 Rouillac, Charente, in the Charente department
 Rouillac, Côtes-d'Armor, in the Côtes-d'Armor department